Skagafjörður is a municipality that covers most of the land area of the region around the fjord with the same name (see Skagafjörður for details on the region) in northern Iceland.

Overview
The municipality was created in 1998 when 11 out of the 12 municipalities in Skagafjörður held votes on whether they should merge or not. The merge was approved in all the municipalities that held the vote. Akrahreppur was the only municipality in Skagafjörður that did not participate. In February 2022, residents of Akrahreppur and Skagafjörður voted to merge into a single municipality; the merger will be formalized in the spring of 2022.

The merge joined the town of Sauðárkrókur, the villages of Hofsós and Varmahlíð and several rural districts. It also includes the historic cathedral site of Hólar which is the site of a growing university today.

Localities

 Ábær
 Hofsós
 Hólar
 Keta
 Miklibær
 Reynistaður
 Sauðárkrókur
 Silfrastaðir
 Varmahlíð
 Viðvík

Twin towns – sister cities

Skagafjörður is twinned with:
 Espoo, Finland
 Køge, Denmark
 Kongsberg, Norway
 Kristianstad, Sweden

References

Municipalities of Iceland
Northwestern Region (Iceland)